John Bennett Blandford Jr. (1897-1972) was the United Nations Relief and Works Agency for Palestine Refugees in the Near East's second Director from 1951 to 1953. Blandford served as chairman of the UNRWA Advisory Commission before becoming director of UNRWA. He had been deputy chief of U.S. Economic Cooperation Administration in Greece and a consultant to president Harry Truman on the Marshall Plan.

See also
 List of Directors and Commissioners-General of the United Nations Relief and Works Agency for Palestine Refugees in the Near East

References

1972 deaths
UNRWA officials
American officials of the United Nations
1897 births